Central College Ground is a multi purpose ground in Bangalore, Karnataka. The ground is mainly used for organizing matches of football, cricket, rugby, American football, athletics, basketball, kabaddi and other sports. The ground has hosted 52 First-class matches  from 1941 when Mysore cricket team played against Hyderabad cricket team.

The ground has hosted two List A matches  2002 when Andhra cricket team played against Kerala cricket team and again in 2002 when Tamil Nadu cricket team played against Kerala cricket team but since then the ground has hosted non-first-class matches.

References

External links 
 Cricketarchive
 Cricinfo
 Wikimapia

Cricket grounds in Karnataka
Sports venues in Bangalore
Sports venues completed in 1935
1935 establishments in India
20th-century architecture in India